AKM Fazlul Kabir Chowdhury was a Bangladeshi politician and member as well as Leader of the Opposition in East Pakistan Provincial Assembly.

Early life
Chowdhury was born in Raozan upazila, Chittagong. Chowdhury completed his graduation and master's degree from University of Calcutta

Career
Chowdhury was the leader of the opposition in the East Pakistan Provincial Assembly. He was the chairman of the legislative committee in the assembly. He served as the founder President of Chittagong Chamber of Commerce and as governor of Marine and Mercantile Academy. He established the Raozan College. He was the Vice-Chairman of Chittagong Port. 

Chowdhury was the president of Chittagong Chamber of Commerce and Industry. He had served in the Chittagong District Council.

Personal life
Chowdhry's eldest son was ABM Fazle Rashid Chowdhury (died 2006) and his other son is A.B.M. Fazle Karim Chowdhury is a member of Bangladesh Parliament and Chairman of the Parliamentary Standing Committee on the Ministry of Railways. Chowdhury’s youngest son A.B.M Fazle Shahid Chowdhury is a businessman, he is also the Chairman of New Era Fashion MFRS (BD) Limited Chowdhury’s brother is Fazlul Quader Chowdhury and brothers-side nephew is Salauddin Quader Chowdhury and sisters-side nephew is Saber Hossain Chowdhury.

Death
Chowdhury died on September 9, 1972 in Dhaka. After his death he was flown back to Chittagong using a chartered flight provided by the government and was buried in his family graveyard at Raozan.

References

1972 deaths
People from Chittagong District
Bangladeshi politicians